Saint Justin may refer to:

 Justin Martyr (103–165)
 Justin the Confessor (d. 269)
 Justin de Jacobis (1800–1860), Italian Lazarist missionary who became Vicar Apostolic of Abyssinia and titular Bishop of Nilopolis
 Justin of Chieti, venerated as an early bishop of Chieti, Italy
 Justin of Siponto (c. 4th century), venerated as Christian martyrs by the Catholic Church
 Saint Justin School, a Catholic elementary school in Santa Clara, California
 St Justin Catholic School, a Catholic elementary school in Edmonton, Alberta

See also
 San Giustino, commune

Justin